is a Japanese football player who play as Midfielder. He currently play for SC Sagamihara.

Club career
Duke was born in Tokyo on February 28, 2000. 

He joined J2 League club Fagiano Okayama from Kawasaki Frontale youth team in 2018. On June 6, he debuted against FC Machida Zelvia in Emperor's Cup.

On 12 January 2021, Duke loaned to Machida Zelvia for a season.

On 6 January 2022, Duke loaned again to Nagano Parceiro. On 28 December at same year, Duke sign transfer to J3 club, SC Sagamihara for upcoming 2023 season.

Career statistics

Club
.

Notes

References

External links

2000 births
Living people
Association football people from Tokyo
Japanese footballers
J2 League players
J3 League players
Fagiano Okayama players
FC Machida Zelvia players
AC Nagano Parceiro players
SC Sagamihara players
Association football midfielders